Moundsville is an unincorporated community in Noble County, in the U.S. state of Ohio.

History
Moundsville was platted in 1861. With the construction of the railroad, business activity shifted to nearby South Olive.

References

Unincorporated communities in Noble County, Ohio
Unincorporated communities in Ohio